John Thorsen (born 11 September 1957) is an Australian former cyclist. He competed in the team pursuit event at the 1976 Summer Olympics.

References

External links
 

1957 births
Living people
Australian male cyclists
Olympic cyclists of Australia
Cyclists at the 1976 Summer Olympics
Australian track cyclists
Place of birth missing (living people)
20th-century Australian people
21st-century Australian people